The Österman Brothers' Virago (Swedish: Bröderna Östermans huskors) is a 1932 Swedish comedy film directed by Thure Alfe and starring Carl Deurell, Artur Rolén and Frida Sporrong. It is one of several films based on the 1913 play of the same title by Oscar Wennersten. Sporrong reprised her role from the 1925 silent film version. It was made at the Segeltorp Studios in Stockholm and on location around Roslagen The film's sets were designed by the art director Bertil Duroj.

Synopsis
The three Österman brothers hire a maid to help them out on their farm, but soon come to regret it when her domineering manner clashes with their lazy ways.

Cast
 Carl Deurell as 	Lars Österman
 Hugo Jacobsson as 	Kalle Österman
 Artur Rolén as 	Nils Österman
 Frida Sporrong as Anna Söderberg
 Nils Jacobsson as 	Axel Olsson
 Solveig Hedengran as Ella Olsson
 Emmy Albiin as Mother Olsson
 Eric Engstam as 	Westman
 Edla Rothgardt as 	Helena Westman

References

Bibliography 
 Larsson, Mariah & Marklund, Anders (ed.). Swedish Film: An Introduction and Reader. Nordic Academic Press, 2010.

External links 
 

1932 films
Swedish comedy films
1932 comedy films
1930s Swedish-language films
Swedish black-and-white films
Swedish films based on plays
Remakes of Swedish films
1930s Swedish films